

Ambassador of the German Empire to the Russian Empire 1871-1914 
 Heinrich VII, Prince Reuss of Köstritz (1868–1876)
 Hans Lothar von Schweinitz (1876–1891)
 Bernhard von Werder (1892–1895)
 Hugo Fürst von Radolin (1895–1901)
 Friedrich Johann von Alvensleben (1901–1905)
 Wilhelm von Schoen (1905–1907)
 Friedrich von Pourtalès (1907–1914)
 World War I

German Ambassadors to the Soviet Union 1918-1991 
1918-18: Wilhelm von Mirbach (assassinated in Moscow)
1918-21: vacant
1921-22: Kurt Wiedenfeld	
1922-28: Ulrich von Brockdorff-Rantzau
1928-33: Herbert von Dirksen	
1933-34: Rudolf Nadolny	
1934-41: Friedrich-Werner Graf von der Schulenburg	
 World War II
1956-58: Wilhelm Haas
1958-62: Hans Kroll
1962–66: Horst Groepper	
1966–68: Gebhardt von Walther
1968–72: Helmut Allardt
1972-77: Ulrich Sahm
1977-80: Hans-Georg Wieck
1980-83: Andreas Meyer-Landrut
1983-87: Hansjörg Kastl		
1987-89: Andreas Meyer-Landrut
1989–93: Klaus Blech

Ambassadors of the Federal Republic of Germany to Russia 
1993-1995: Otto von der Gablentz
1995-2002: Ernst-Jörg von Studnitz
2002-2005: Hans-Friedrich von Ploetz
2005-2010: Walter Jürgen Schmid
2010-2013: Ulrich Brandenburg
2014–2019: Rüdiger Freiherr von Fritsch
2019–    : Géza Andreas von Geyr

See also
Embassy of Germany, Moscow
Russian Ambassador to Germany

References

External links
 https://germania.diplo.de/ru-de/vertretungen/botschaft

 
Russia
Germany